Augustine Hailwood JP (11 Dec. 1875 – 1 Dec. 1939), was a British baker and Unionist Party politician, MP for Manchester Ardwick from 1918-22.

Background
Hailwood was born the son of James and Elizabeth Hailwood. He was educated at Xaverian College, Manchester. He married Mary Hilda Amiel. They had three sons.

Political career
Hailwood was a member of Manchester City Council from 1909–11. He was Hon. Secretary of the East Manchester Unionist and Unionist Association. He was Unionist candidate for the Manchester Ardwick division at the 1918 General Election. He was endorsed by the Coalition government and was easily elected. He was defeated at the 1922 General Election, lost again in 1923 and did not stand in 1924. He was a Justice of the peace for the City of Manchester. He was a Governor of St Bede's College, Manchester. He did not stand for parliament again.

Electoral record

References

1875 births
1939 deaths
Conservative Party (UK) MPs for English constituencies